The 2018–19 California Golden Bears men's basketball team represented the University of California, Berkeley in the 2018–19 NCAA Division I men's basketball season. This was Wyking Jones' second year as head coach at California. The Golden Bears played their home games at Haas Pavilion as members of the Pac-12 Conference. They finished the season 8–23, 3–15 in Pac-12 play to finish in last place. They lost in the first round of the Pac-12 tournament to Colorado.

On March 24, head coach Wyking Jones was fired. He finished with a 2-year record of 16–47 overall and 5–31 in the Pac-12. Former Georgia and Nevada head coach Mark Fox was hired to replace him on March 29.

Previous season
The Golden Bears finished the 2017–18 season with a record of 8–24, 2–16 in Pac-12 play to finish in last place. They lost in the first round of the Pac-12 tournament to Stanford.

Off-season

Departures

2018 recruiting class

Future recruits

2019 team recruits

Roster

Schedule and results

|-
!colspan=9 style=| Exhibition

|-
!colspan=9 style=| Non-conference regular season

|-
!colspan=9 style=|  Pac-12 regular season

|-
!colspan=9 style=| Pac-12 tournament

References

California Golden Bears men's basketball seasons
California
California Golden
California Golden